Irymple may refer to:

Irymple, New South Wales
Irymple, Victoria